Matthew George Frewer (born January 4, 1958) is an American-Canadian actor, singer and comedian. He portrayed the 1980s icon Max Headroom in the 1985 TV film and 1987 television series of the same names. 

He became prominent when playing roles in films, like Russell Thompson, Sr. in Honey, I Shrunk the Kids (1989), Jobe Smith in Lawnmower Man 2: Beyond Cyberspace (1996), Frank in Dawn of the Dead (2004), Moloch in Watchmen (2009), Mitch in 50/50 (2011) and Archibald Stanley in Night at the Museum: Secret of the Tomb (2014).

His television credits include Dr. Mike Stratford in Doctor Doctor (1989–1991), Bob in Shaky Ground (1992–1993), Matt Prager in Psi Factor: Chronicles of the Paranormal (1997–1999), Dr. Jim Taggart in Eureka (2006–2012) and Doctor Leekie in the Canadian science fiction drama Orphan Black (2013–2017).

Frewer's more recent performances include a portrayal of "General #2" in the Steven Spielberg picture The BFG (2016), the character Carnage in the Netflix series Altered Carbon in 2018 and Logan in Fear the Walking Dead (2019). Also, he portrayed The Binder in 3 episodes of The Magicians and Peter Morton in 8 episodes of The Order (2019−2020).

His voice roles include Panic in Hercules and its 1998 television series, Inspector 47 in The Magic School Bus, the Pink Panther in the 1993 television series of the same name, Lloyd Christmas in the Dumb and Dumber animated series, Jackal in Gargoyles and Dedgar Deadman in Toonsylvania.

Early life
Frewer was born in Washington, D.C., one of five children born to Gillian Anne (née German) and Captain Frederick Charlesley Frewer, a Royal Canadian Navy officer. He was raised in Peterborough, Ontario, where he graduated from Lakefield College School. He went on to train at the Bristol Old Vic Theatre School, graduating from its three-year acting course in 1980. His brother Frederick Barry Frewer also served in the Canadian Navy.

Career

Frewer portrayed the artificial intelligence character Max Headroom in the 1980s, starring in the 1985 eponymous science fiction television film; Frewer also played award-winning Network 23 journalist Edison Carter in the film. This led to a series on the UK Channel 4 network with the Max Headroom character as a video jockey and interviewer. This ran for two seasons, the second of which featured a studio audience with whom Max interacted.  In 1987, an American series based upon the 1985 film aired, titled Max Headroom (1987–1988). From 1993-1995, Frewer voiced the Pink Panther for the television series. Frewer guest-starred in the fifth-season Star Trek: The Next Generation episode “A Matter of Time”. He also portrayed the character in other media, including a series of television commercials for "New Coke" and "Radio Rentals", as well as the single and music video for "Paranoimia" by Art of Noise. He reprised this role in the science fiction comedy film Pixels (2015).

Frewer starred as Mike Stratford in Doctor Doctor (1989–1991). He also appeared as Trashcan Man in the television miniseries The Stand. Frewer has also appeared in such films as The Fourth Protocol (1987), Honey, I Shrunk the Kids (1989), National Lampoon's Senior Trip (1995), and the 2004 remake of Dawn of the Dead.

Frewer was nominated for two Gemini Awards in 2000, one for a guest appearance on Da Vinci's Inquest and another for his work on the series Mentors. He was a regular on Eureka during the series' first two seasons, playing Jim Taggart. He has done voice-over work on several animated projects, including Batman: The Animated Series (1993) and The Incredible Hulk (1996–1997). Frewer portrayed Matt Praeger in Psi Factor: Chronicles of the Paranormal from 1997–2000.

In 2009, Frewer portrayed the retired villain Moloch the Mystic in Watchmen and appeared as the White Knight in the December 2009 Syfy two-part miniseries Alice, based upon Alice's Adventures in Wonderland. He starred as Pestilence in two episodes of Season 5 of Supernatural. He has appeared in several adaptations of Stephen King stories, such as The Stand, Quicksilver Highway, Riding the Bullet, Desperation and Bag of Bones.

He played Dr. Aldous Leekie on the first two seasons of Orphan Black.

In 2018, Frewer portrayed Carnage in the Netflix series Altered Carbon. In the same year, Frewer was cast in the Netflix horror-drama series, The Order.

Personal life

Frewer has been married to Amanda Hillwood since 1984. In 1989, they bought a house in Marina del Rey, California.

Filmography

Film

Television

Video games

Radio
 Tales from the Mausoleum Club:  Episode 2, "Heart of Skegness"

Awards and nominations

References

External links

 Mattblank.com interview

1958 births
Living people
20th-century American male actors
20th-century Canadian male actors
21st-century American male actors
21st-century Canadian male actors
American emigrants to Canada
American male film actors
American male stage actors
American male television actors
American male voice actors
Alumni of Bristol Old Vic Theatre School
CableACE Award winners
Canadian male film actors
Canadian male stage actors
Canadian male television actors
Canadian male voice actors
Canadian Screen Award winners
Lakefield College School alumni
Male actors from Ontario
People from Peterborough, Ontario
Male actors from Washington, D.C.
Audiobook narrators